Maypole is a dispersed settlement located on the island of St Mary's, the largest of the Isles of Scilly, England. It is a tourist and farming area, with the only horse riding school in the islands.

Nearby are Holy Vale and Pelistry. The A3110 road runs through the area; on this road to the west of Maypole, towards Telegraph, is Silver Carn or High Lanes, a small settlement which includes a large guesthouse and café.

References

Hamlets in the Isles of Scilly
Populated places on St Mary's, Isles of Scilly